Hermann Horner (30 January 1892 – probably in 1942) was an Austrian-Hungarian operatic bass-baritone. He performed on numerous stages in Germany and Czechoslovakia and was a guest at the Bayreuth Festival. He was murdered by the NS regime.

Life and career 
Horner was born as the son of a hotel owner in Rzeszów. From 1916 to 1918 he served as a non-commissioned officer in the Austrian army in Montenegro and Albania.

Horner completed his vocal studies in Belgium and made his debut at the Vlaamse Opera in Antwerp. From 1919 to 1923 he was engaged at the City Theatre of Lemberg. This was followed by positions at the Wrocław Opera (1923/24), the Staatsoper Unter den Linden (1924/25), at the Prague State Opera  (1925–27), at the Staatstheater Stuttgart (1927–29) and the Staatstheater Nürnberg (1929–33). He was suspended from duty with immediate effect. He first went back to Rzeszów and then to Czechoslovakia, where he was engaged for two years (1933–35) at the municipal theatre of Aussig.

Horner was married to Anna, née Koller, who was born in Lwiw in 1892. The couple had at least three children, all born in Stuttgart: Mario (born 1925 or 1926), Eva (also Ewa, born 1930) and Ludwig (also Ludvik, born in 1931 or 1932).

The whole family was murdered. According to Danny Newman, an in-laws relative, Horner was shot along with his younger son while trying to protect his son from the Nazis who murdered the other family members in a gas truck.

Horner died in the Ghetto Reichshof or in the Belzec extermination camp.

Repertoire 
The list of roles was created based on Kutsch/Riemens and the Vox recording book.

Recording 
Horner's voice has been handed down through vox recordings from 1923, he sang arias of the Landgrave and King Henry (from Tannhäuser and Lohengrin), as well as the Porterlied of Plumkett from the opera Martha and the Trinklied of Falstaff from the opera The Merry Wives of Windsor.

Memorial 
His name can be found on a commemorative plaque for Nazi victims in the Staatstheater Stuttgart, which was unveiled on April 7, 2016 by Minister Theresia Bauer together with the director of the Staatstheater.

Further reading 
 Hannes Heer:  Die Vertreibung der "Juden" aus der Oper 1933 bis 1945. Der Kampf um das Württembergische Landestheater Stuttgart. Eine Ausstellung. Metropol Verlag, Berlin 2008, .
 Karl-Josef Kutsch, Leo Riemens: Großes Sängerlexikon. Fourth, extended and updated edition. K. G. Saur, Munich 2003, volume 4, .

External links

References 

Operatic bass-baritones
Jewish emigrants from Austria after the Anschluss
People killed by gas chamber by Nazi Germany
1892 births
1940s deaths
People from Rzeszów
20th-century Austrian male opera singers
Austro-Hungarian military personnel of World War I
People who died in Belzec extermination camp